The Grief of Others is a 2015 American tragedy film written and directed by Patrick Wang. It is based on the 2011 novel The Grief of Others by Leah Hager Cohen. The film stars Wendy Moniz, Trevor St. John, Rachel Dratch, Chris Conroy, Sonya Harum and Mike Faist.

Cast
Wendy Moniz as Ricky Ryrie
Trevor St. John as John Ryrie
Rachel Dratch as Madeleine Berkowitz
Chris Conroy as Lance Oprisu
Jenna Cooperman as Fiona
Mike Faist as Gordie Joiner 
Sonya Harum as Jessica Safransky
Theo Iyer as Hugh Chaudhuri
Oona Laurence as Biscuit Ryrie
Henry Gagliardi as Young Paul Ryrie

Release
The film premiered at South by Southwest on March 15, 2015.

Critical reception

The film was received with positive reviews.
Rotten Tomatoes gives a score of 92% based on 9 reviews, with an average score of 7.6/10.
At Metacritic it scored 78% based on reviews from 8 critics, considered "Generally favorable reviews".

The New York Times said "It's an artful portrait of a world that refuses the order we try to impose on it when we close ourselves off to heartache, doubt and pain."

Variety said the film is "A delicate, elliptically structured portrait of six wounded souls coping with the aftermath of tragedy."

The Los Angeles Times said "Harder to miss, however, in every grainy 16mm shot and heartfelt performance is the movie's understated soul, as Wang guides us, sometimes awkwardly, usually touchingly, from isolation and secrets into understanding and connection."

References

External links
 

2015 films
2015 drama films
American drama films
Films directed by Patrick Wang
2010s English-language films
2010s American films